Trond Erik Bertelsen (born 5 June 1984 in Sandnes) is a retired Norwegian football player who currently works for Sandnes Ulf.

He is originally from Sandnes where he played for Lura IL. The fast paced left back has 32 U21-international caps and 30 caps as a younger national team player. Bertelsen came to Fredrikstad FK from FK Haugesund during the winter of 2004, and was one of the first signings of coach Egil «Drillo» Olsen. In January 2006 he made his full international debut for the Norway national football team, and has received a total of three caps (23 September 2007). In 2006 he made four appearances in the Norwegian Football Cup, including an assist in the 3-0 quarter-final win against Vålerenga Fotball as Fredrikstad FK won the cup for the 11th time in the clubs history. Bertelsen also had a trial with Premier League side Aston Villa back in 2001, as a 17-year-old.

Bertelsen was linked to Viking during the summer of 2007, as he was meant to replace the position as left back for the ageing Thomas Pereira. Bertelsen expressed happiness over the possibility of returning to Rogaland to play for Viking. Viking though cancelled the transfer as a result of the knee injury that had plagued him, and worries over his possibilities of returning to top level football.  Eventually Bertelsen and the two clubs came to an agreement and a contract was signed with the Stavanger club.

Career statistics

References

External links
 

1984 births
Living people
People from Sandnes
Norwegian footballers
Norway youth international footballers
Norway international footballers
FK Haugesund players
Fredrikstad FK players
Viking FK players
Sandnes Ulf players
Norwegian First Division players
Eliteserien players
Association football defenders
Sportspeople from Rogaland